Events in the year 2001 in Mexico.

Incumbents

Federal government
 President: Vicente Fox 

 Interior Secretary (SEGOB): Santiago Creel
 Secretary of Foreign Affairs (SRE): Jorge Castañeda Gutman
 Communications Secretary (SCT): Pedro Cerisola
 Education Secretary (SEP): Reyes Tamez
 Secretary of Defense (SEDENA): Gerardo Clemente Vega
 Secretary of Navy (SEMAR): Marco Antonio Peyrot González
 Secretary of Labor and Social Welfare (STPS): José Carlos María Abascal Carranza
 Secretary of Welfare (SEDESOL): Josefina Vázquez Mota
 Tourism Secretary (SECTUR): Leticia Navarro
 Secretary of the Environment (SEMARNAT): Víctor Lichtinger
 Secretary of Health (SALUD): Julio Frenk
Attorney General of Mexico (PRG): Rafael Macedo de la Concha

Supreme Court

 President of the Supreme Court: Genaro David Góngora Pimentel

Governors

 Aguascalientes: Felipe González González 
 Baja California
Alejandro González Alcocer , until October 31.
Eugenio Elorduy Walther , starting November 1.
Baja California Sur: Leonel Cota Montaño  
 Campeche: José Antonio González Curi
 Chiapas: Pablo Salazar Mendiguchía  
 Chihuahua: Patricio Martínez García 
 Coahuila: Enrique Martínez y Martínez 
 Colima: Fernando Moreno Peña 
 Durango: Ángel Sergio Guerrero Mier 
 Guanajuato: Juan Carlos Romero Hicks 
 Guerrero: René Juárez Cisneros 
 Hidalgo: Manuel Ángel Núñez Soto 
 Jalisco: Alberto Cárdenas 
 State of Mexico: Arturo Montiel 
 Michoacán: Víctor Manuel Tinoco Rubí  
 Morelos: Sergio Estrada Cajigal Ramírez .
 Nayarit: Antonio Echevarría Domínguez
 Nuevo León: Fernando Canales Clariond 
 Oaxaca: José Murat Casab 
 Puebla: Melquíades Morales 
 Querétaro: Ignacio Loyola Vera 
 Quintana Roo: Joaquín Hendricks Díaz 
 San Luis Potosí: Fernando Silva Nieto
 Sinaloa: Juan S. Millán 
 Sonora: Armando López Nogales
 Tabasco: Enrique Priego Oropeza , acting governor January 1-December 31
 Tamaulipas: Tomás Yarrington 	
 Tlaxcala: Alfonso Sánchez Anaya 
 Veracruz: Miguel Alemán Velasco 
 Yucatán: Víctor Cervera Pacheco 
 Zacatecas: Ricardo Monreal 
Head of Government of the Federal District: Andrés Manuel López Obrador

Events

 Pemexgate is uncovered. 
 April 29: The Guadalajara Mexico Temple is opened in Mexico City. 
 September 28: Nuestra Belleza México 2001 
 November 22: The Mexican Council on Foreign Relations is established

Awards	

	
Belisario Domínguez Medal of Honor	– José Ezequiel Iturriaga Sauco
Order of the Aztec Eagle	
National Prize for Arts and Sciences	
National Public Administration Prize	
Ohtli Award
 Marco Antonio Firebaugh
 Raúl Héctor Castro
 Carlos Cortez
 Enrique Moreno
 Cecilia Muñoz

Births
 January 17 - Angie Vazquez, Mexican singer, and banded from Vazquez Sounds. 
August 24 – Mildred Maldonado, rhythmic gymnast

Deaths

June 3 – Anthony Quinn, Mexican-American actor, painter, writer, and film director (b. 1915)

Hurricanes

 August 14–22: Tropical Storm Chantal (2001) 
 September 21 – October 3: Hurricane Juliette (2001) 
 October 4–9: Hurricane Iris

Film

 List of Mexican films of 2001

Sport

 Primera División de México Verano 2001
 Primera División de México Invierno 2001 
 Mexico loses 2001 Copa América final to Colombia
 Sin Piedad (2001) 
 Juicio Final (2001) 
 2001 Centrobasket is held in Toluca, 
 Estudiantes de Altamira and Estudiantes de Xalapa are founded.

References

 
Years of the 21st century in Mexico
Mexico
2000s in Mexico
Mexico